Feelin's is an  album by saxophonist Sonny Stitt recorded in 1962 and originally released on the Roost label.

Reception
The Allmusic site awarded the album 3 stars.

Track listing 
All compositions by Sonny Stitt except as indicated
 "O Sole Mio" (Giovanni Capurro, Eduardo di Capua) - 3:42 
 "Feelin's" - 3:53 
 "Nightmare" - 2:15 
 "S'posin'" (Paul Denniker, Andy Razaf) - 6:17 
 "Look Up" - 3:09 
 "Goodnight, Ladies" (Edwin Pearce Christy) - 3:49 
 "If I Should Lose You" (Ralph Rainger, Leo Robin) - 5:17 
 "Hollerin' the Blues" - 4:47
 "Stretch Pants" - 5:07

Personnel 
Sonny Stitt - alto saxophone, tenor saxophone
Don Patterson - organ
Paul Weeden - guitar
Billy James - drums

References 

1962 albums
Albums produced by Teddy Reig
Roost Records albums
Sonny Stitt albums